Malaysia competed in the 1997 Southeast Asian Games held in Jakarta, Indonesia from 11 to 19 December 1997.

Medal summary

Medals by sport

Medallists

Football

Men's tournament
Group A

Women's tournament
Group B

References

1997
Nations at the 1997 Southeast Asian Games